Hanti Station is a station on the Bundang Line, a commuter rail line of Korail.

The name of this station is taken from that of a former village in the vicinity, and has meaning "great hill" in the native Korean language. Daechi (大峙), the neighborhood in which the station is located, is the Chinese translation of this name. Prior to opening, this station was tentatively known as Yeongdong Station. The current name 'Hanti Station' was selected in order to avoid confusion with an existing Yeongdong station (in Yeongdong County) on the Gyeongbu Line.

The Gangnam Lotte Department Store has a direct underground link with the station. There are many restaurants and academies near Hanti Station.

References

Seoul Metropolitan Subway stations
Metro stations in Gangnam District
Railway stations opened in 2003